Nelson Morgan Davis was a Canadian businessman. He owned a conglomerate of more than 50 transportation and manufacturing companies, and was one of Canada's richest people. 

He served as director of the Canadian Bank of Commerce, the Crown Trust Company, the Argus Corporation and the Canadian Imperial Bank of Commerce.

Early life 
He was born in Cleveland, Ohio, to father Ernest H. Davis. He went to Cornell University and was a member of Sigma Chi.
He married Eloise White on September 6, 1930, in New Rochelle, New York.
He later lived on Toronto's Riverside Drive, and in Phoenix, Arizona.

In 1950, he created an exclusive golf course in Box Grove, Ontario. In 1967, he sold it to IBM for an estimated $2 million.

In September 1969, his niece was kidnapped, and Davis paid $200,000 for her return.

Through his company, NM Davis Corp, he purchased many businesses, including Rupert E. Edwards' Canada Varnish, in February 1953. His brother, Marsh Davis, ran one of his purchased trucking companies.

Properties 
A 1968 directory lists some of his properties as follows:
 CanVar Industries Ltd
 Admiral Acceptance Ltd
 Arrow Leasing Ltd
 Automobile Tranport Ltd
 Brennan Paving Co
 Carwil Tranport Ltd
 Central Chevrolet Toronto
 Inter-city Truck Lines
 The Markham Sand and Gravel Ltd
 Miller Paving
 North York Chevrolet
 Parkwood Motors
 Trans-Canada Highway Express Ltd
 Atlantic Distributing
 Dayton Rubber
 Great Lakes Supply
 Industrial Tankers Ltd
 Orange Crush Bottlers

Estate 
When he died in 1979 he left his estate worth tens of millions of dollars to his son, Glen Davis. Glen donated to numerous conservation and philanthropic organizations until he wass murdered, on May 18, 2007. The motive for the murder was a lawsuit regarding a disputed loan from N.M. Davis Corp.

References

Businesspeople from Cleveland
1979 deaths
Cornell University alumni